is a passenger railway station located in the city of Miki, Hyōgo Prefecture, Japan, operated by the private Kobe Electric Railway (Shintetsu).

Lines

Station layout
The station consists of a ground-level island platform connected to the station building by a level crossing. The station is unattended.

Platforms

Adjacent stations

History
Hirono Golf-jō-mae Station opened on December 28, 1936. It was renamed  on December 22, 1942 and reverted to its original name on April 1, 1951.

Passenger statistics
In fiscal 2019, the station was used by an average of 474 passengers daily.

Surrounding area
 Hirono Golf Club
Miki Municipal Midorigaoka Elementary School
Miki Special Needs School

See also
List of railway stations in Japan

References

External links

 Official website (Kobe Electric Railway) 

Railway stations in Japan opened in 1936
Railway stations in Hyōgo Prefecture
Miki, Hyōgo